This article shows the rosters of all participating teams at the women's indoor volleyball tournament at the 2009 Mediterranean Games in Pescara.

















References

External links
 Official website

Mediterranean Games Women's volleyball squads
Volleyball at the Mediterranean Games
2009 in volleyball